Yorimitsu is a masculine Japanese given name.

Possible writings
Yorimitsu can be written using different combinations of kanji characters. Here are some examples:

頼光, "rely, light"
頼満, "rely, full"
依光, "to depend on, light"
依満, "to depend on, full"

The name can also be written in hiragana よりみつ or katakana ヨリミツ.

Notable people with the name
 (948–1021), Japanese warrior and character of folklore
 (1480–1540), Japanese samurai and daimyō

Japanese masculine given names